Daniel Bangalter (born 1947), known in his musical career as Daniel Vangarde, is a French songwriter and producer. He co-wrote and produced a number of hit records in the 1970s, including "Aie a Mwana", "D.I.S.C.O." (recorded by Ottawan), and "Cuba"  (The Gibson Brothers).

Biography
In the early 1970s, as Daniel Vangarde, he worked with French singers, husband and wife Ringo (real name Guy Bayle) and Sheila (later known as Sheila B. Devotion), as well as releasing some records under his own name in France. On many of these and later records he worked with fellow writer and producer Jean Kluger.

In 1971 Vangarde and Kluger released the cult LP Le Monde Fabuleux Des Yamasuki as the Yamasuki Singers, a pseudo-Japanese concept album of pop songs, described on the sleeve of its CD reissue as "a fuzzed-out-educational-multi-cultural psych-rock-opera.... proto-psychedelic hip-hop with overweight drum beats and basslines". The song "Aieaoa" on the album was later recorded, as "Aie a Mwana", first by Black Blood and then by Bananarama, becoming the first UK hit for the latter group.   Vangarde's main international successes came later in the 1970s, as writer and producer with Ottawan's "D.I.S.C.O." and the Gibson Brothers's "Cuba".   Using the pseudonym Who's Who, he recorded the album Who's Who in 1979.  He also worked extensively with the Antillean group La Compagnie Créole, popular in France in the 1980s.

Vangarde is Jewish. Vangarde has campaigned to ensure that descendants of Jewish artists in France whose rights were taken from them in the Second World War received financial compensation. Since the 1990s, he has lived in Caraíva, Bahia, Brazil, where he founded a community charity, Caraívaviva.

In May 2013, the London magazine Dazed & Confused featured an hour-long mix of funk, disco and electro produced by Vangarde.

Vangarde is the father of Thomas Bangalter, who is best known as a member of the electronic music duo Daft Punk. He is credited with aiding the duo in their early musical career.

References

External links
Bide-et-Musiques discography
 

1947 births
Living people
French dance musicians
French electronic musicians
20th-century French Jews
French songwriters
Male songwriters
French record producers
French emigrants to Brazil